"Pomoć, pomoć" ("Help, Help") is the first song which appeared on the first single by Serbian new wave band Idoli. The song, with "Retko te viđam sa devojkama" appeared on the A-side while the B-side contained Slobodan Škerović's narrative poem called "Poklon". The song was performed live by the band for a very short time and there are no cover versions of the song.

Cover versions 
 The soundtrack album for Tri palme za dve bitange i ribicu written by Vlada Divljan featured a cover version of "Pomoć, pomoć" performed by Divljan and URGH! vocalist Ghuru Ghagi.

Track listing 
 Idoli - "Pomoć, pomoć"
 Idoli - "Retko te vidjam sa devojkama"
 Slobodan Škerović - Poklon

Personnel 
 Vlada Divljan (guitar, vocals)
 Srđan Šaper (percussion, vocals)
 Nebojša Krstić (percussion)
 Zdenko Kolar (bass guitar)
 Boža Jovanović (drums)

External links 
 Pomoć, Pomoć / Poklon at Discogs

1980 singles
Idoli songs
Songs written by Vlada Divljan
1980 songs